Alfred Mayer may refer to:

Alfred G. Mayer (1868–1922), marine biologist and zoologist
Alfred M. Mayer (1836–1897), physicist
Alfred Mayer (politician), Austrian politician
Jones v. Alfred H. Mayer Co., a landmark United States Supreme Court case
Alf Mayer (sport shooter) (1938–2021), Canadian Olympic shooter